Harsh Singh may refer to:

Harsh Singh (politician) (born 24 June 1954) is an MLA of BJP from Rampur Baghelan (Satna).
Harsh Singh (cricketer) (born 20 September 1995) is an Indian cricketer.